Andrew Harris (born 7 March 1994) is an Australian professional tennis player from Melbourne. He was the winner of the junior doubles titles at the 2012 Wimbledon Championships and the Roland Garros Junior French Championship. He signed a National Letter of Intent with Oklahoma Sooners to participate in 2013.

In October 2013, Harris won his first Futures title.

Professional career

2011
Harris's first appearance in a professional tournament was at the Australia F7 in September 2011, where he made the quarter final before losing to Alex Bolt.

2012
Harris lost in round 1 of the 2012 Australian Open qualification to Denys Molchanov, before competing in three Future tournaments in Australia. His best result being a quarter final in Australia F4 in March where he retired whilst playing Maverick Banes. Harris played only one more tournament in 2012, the Great Britain F10 in July, where he lost in the second round.

2013
Harris successfully returned to competition in May 2013, where he made the final of the Thailand F2, losing to Saketh Myneni of India. The following week, he made the semi-final of the Thailand F3, losing to fellow Australian Adam Feeney in straight sets. Throughout June and July, Harris competed in Futures throughout Europe, his best performance being a quarter-final in Belgium F4, before winning his first title in Texas at the USA F27 against Dennis Nevolo.

2014
Harris retired from round 1 of the qualification for the 2014 Brisbane International before competing in the Men's qualifying of the 2014 Australian Open, where he made round 2. Harris didn't play again until June, where he played in 5 futures in the USA. The best result was at the F17 in Oklahoma City, where he was runner-up to Jared Donaldson.

2015
Harris commenced the 2015 season at the Onkaparinga Challenger, where he qualified and registered his first challenger main draw win, defeating Hiroki Moriya 7–5, 6–1. He made it to the semi final, before losing to Marcos Baghdatis. This increased Harris's ATP ranking 157 places to a career high of No. 497.
Harris made the second round of Australian Open qualifying. This was the last match Harris played for almost 2 years.

2017
In January 2017, Harris returned to tennis gaining a wild card into the 2017 Canberra Challenger. He defeated Thomas Fancutt in round 1, before losing to Jan-Lennard Struff in a close 3-set match. Harris didn't play again until June 2017 on the ITF Futures circuit in USA. In July, he lost in qualifying rounds of two Canadian Challenger events. In September, Harris returned to Australia and won his second ITF title at Toowoomba in October.

2018
Harris spend the 2018 year on the ITF Futures and ATP Challenger Circuits across Australia and United States of America. His best performances were semi final results at Launceston in February, Australia F4 in March, USA F19 in July and USA F23 in August.

2019: First Challenger finals, ATP top 200
In February, Harris reached his first ATP Challenger Tour final at Chennai Open Challenger. The result led to a career-high ranking. In May, Harris reached the final of Busan Challenger, further improving his ranking. In August, Harris lost in the first round of 2019 US Open – Men's singles qualifying.

2020: Grand Slam debut
Harris was awarded a wildcard into the 2020 Australian Open, where he lost in straight sets to 8th seed Matteo Berrettini. Harris ended 2020 with a singles rank of 229.

2021: First ATP Main draw win
Harris commenced 2021 at the 2021 Murray River Open, where he recorded his first ATP main draw win against Taro Daniel. Harris lost in the second round of the 2021 Australian Open – Men's singles qualifying. This was the final tournament Harris played for the year.

2022 
Harris lost in the first round of the 2022 Australian Open – Men's singles qualifying.

Junior Grand Slam finals

Doubles: 2 (2 titles)

Challenger and Futures/World Tennis Tour finals

Singles: 9 (2–7)

Doubles: 8 (5–3)

Performance timeline

Singles

References

External links
 
 
 

1994 births
Living people
Tennis players from Melbourne
Australian male tennis players
Oklahoma Sooners men's tennis players
French Open junior champions
Wimbledon junior champions
Grand Slam (tennis) champions in boys' doubles